Trevor Swinburne (born 20 June 1953) is an English retired professional football goalkeeper who made nearly 250 appearances in the Football League for Carlisle United.

He also played league football for Brentford, Lincoln City, Sunderland, Doncaster Rovers and Leeds United.

Personal life 
Swinburne's father, Tom, and brother Alan were also professional footballers. After retiring from football in 1987, Swinburne worked for the Her Majesty's Prison Service and eventually became a governor.

As of 2020 Swinburne was the chairman of Lincoln City Former players association and host of Lincoln City Radio Sports Zone.

Honours 
Sunderland

FA youth cup winner: 1968-1969

FA cup winner (Squad member) : 1972-73

Carlisle United

 Football League Third Division second-place promotion: 1981–82

Career statistics

References

External links
 

1953 births
Living people
English footballers
Association football goalkeepers
Sunderland A.F.C. players
Carlisle United F.C. players
Brentford F.C. players
Leeds United F.C. players
Doncaster Rovers F.C. players
Lincoln City F.C. players
English Football League players